Portals to Canaan is the eighth studio album by Californian death metal band Deeds of Flesh.  It was released on June 25, 2013 on Unique Leader Records. This is the last album to feature Erik Lindmark before his death in 2018.

Track listing
Amidst the Ruins - 4:32
Entranced in Decades of Psychedelic Sleep - 6:39
Rise of the Virvum Juggernaut - 4:13
Celestial Serpents - 5:36
Caelum Hirundines Terra / The Sky Swallows the Earth - 1:47
Xeno-Virus - 5:30
Hollow Human Husks - 4:09
Portals to Canaan - 4:35
Orphans of Sickness (Gorguts cover) - 5:26

Personnel
Erik Lindmark - guitars, vocals
Mike Hamilton - drums
Craig Peters - lead guitars
Ivan Munguia - bass guitar

2013 albums
Deeds of Flesh albums
Unique Leader Records albums